Richard kennedy is a Canadian retired ice hockey winger and coach who was the NCAA Scoring Champion in 1972–73.

Career
Kennedy was enticed to join the fairly new program at Saint Louis University in 1971 due to knowing that, being a new program, he could play top minutes straight away and that the Billikens played their home games in the St. Louis Arena, the home of the St. Louis Blues. After a decent freshman season, Kennedy's numbers exploded in his sophomore campaign; he led the nation in goals (47), assists (49) and points (96), leading the country's best offense to the top of the CCHA. Unfortunately, due to the low regard for the conference by most of college hockey, Kennedy's accomplishments went unrecognized outside of the CCHA. Due to this lack of respect, Saint Louis knew the conference tournament would be the end of their season. Despite dominating during the season, Saint Louis lost the opening game to Bowling Green and had to settle for second place.

As an upperclassmen, Kennedy's numbers declined as the team's strength of schedule improved but the Billikens were much more focused come playoff time, winning consecutive CCHA championships with Kennedy being named to the All-CCHA teams three years running. After graduating Kennedy played one season of senior hockey before hanging up his skates. He eventually became the head coach at Christian Brothers College and led the team to four MSCHA championships. He was inducted into the St. Louis Amateur Hockey Hall of Fame in 2010.

Career statistics

Regular season and playoffs

Awards and honours

References

External links

1951 births
Living people
Canadian ice hockey centres
Ice hockey people from Ontario
People from Weston, Toronto
Saint Louis Billikens men's ice hockey players
Sioux City Musketeers players